The Vicious Years is a 1950 American film directed by Robert Florey. The screenplay concerns an orphan named Mario who witnesses Luca Rossi committing a murder, and blackmails Luca into taking him home as a member of his family.

Plot 
Mario, an Italian war orphan, sees Luca Rossi commit a murder. Eager for a home and family life, Mario promises not to tell the police if Luca takes him into his household and family. Luca fears and hates Mario, but his father, mother and sister all come to love him. Afraid the Mario will reveal his secret, Luca attempts to kill him. Aware now, just as he has suspected, Emilio Rossi realizes that his son is no good and turns him over to the police. Mario is persuaded to stay with the family as an adopted son.

Cast 
 Tommy Cook as Mario
 Sybil Merritt as Dina Rossi
 Eduard Franz as Emilio Rossi
 Gar Moore as Luca Rossi
 Anthony Ross as Inspector Umberto Spezia
 Marjorie Eaton as Zia Lola
 Russ Tamblyn as Tino 
 Eve Miller as Giulia
 Lester Sharpe as Matteo
 John Doucette as Giorgio

External links 
 

1950 films
Films directed by Robert Florey
1950 crime drama films
American crime drama films
1950s English-language films
Film Classics films
American black-and-white films
1950s American films